José Pereira (22 January 193126 January 2015) was a Sanskrit scholar, historian, writer, artist, and linguist from Goa, India.

Writings
Pereira was the author of 24 books and 145 journal articles.

Paintings
Pereira was internationally recognised for his fresco paintings. His first works, titled  "Images of Goa", were exhibited in Mumbai when he was 18 while still a student at J J School of Art. The works would also be exhibited in Delhi, in 1969.

Languages
Dr Pereira was fluent in at least 13 languages. In particular, he was a strong supporter of the Konkani language.

Recognition
In 2012, the Government of India conferred the Padma Bhushan, the highest civilian award on India, on Pereira in recognition of his work in the field of Indian history and literature. He is considered to be the only Goan to be conferred
this award while being non-resident in India.

Controversy
Dr Pereira was awarded a PhD in Ancient History and Culture from St Xavier's College  in 1949 then later graduated, with honours, from Siddharth College in 1951. In 1959, he traveled to Portugal as a guest lecturer at the Insituto Superior de Estudoes Ultramarinos in Lisbon. A year later, he departed Lisbon following his public statement that “Goa has a cultural identity of its own and can never be a showcase of the greatness of the Portuguese.”

In later life, his "Epiphanies of the Hindu Gods" caused Hindu fundamentalists to protest in 2010 due to the nudity in the artwork. Pereira countered with quotations from Sanskrit scriptures that justified the piece.

References

Indian Sanskrit scholars
Scholars from Goa
Konkani people
Musicians from Goa
Recipients of the Padma Bhushan in literature & education
Sir Jamsetjee Jeejebhoy School of Art alumni
1931 births
2015 deaths
20th-century Indian historians
20th-century Indian linguists